Wet Za Wet is an album from Polish punk rock band Abaddon. The album has been re-released in 2001 on CD.

Track listing
Wet za wet
Boimy sie siebie
Apartheid
Ljubljana Night
Kto?
Koniec swiata
System
III wojna
Rewolucja

CD bonus tracks
Kukly
Walcz o siebie
Abaddon
Zolnierz tego swiata

Personnel
Tomasz Lutek Frost - bass guitar
Bernard Beniu Szarafinski- guitar
Tomasz Perełka Dorn - drums
Waldemar Kiki Jedyczkowski - vocals

Resources
http://homepages.nyu.edu/~cch223/poland/albums/abaddon_walczoswojawolnosc.html, URL accessed at 31 August 2006

1986 debut albums
Abaddon (band) albums